The Handball Liga Austria (HLA) is the professional handball league of Austria.

Competition format 

The season begins with a regular season between the ten teams. The first five teams qualify for a first playoff round, while the last five play a play-down round. At the end of this second round, the five teams of the playoff round and the top three teams of the play-down round play elimination rounds. The last two play a relegation round.

2017/18 Season participants

The following ten clubs compete in the Handball Liga Austria during the 2016–17 season.

Handball Liga Austria past champions

 1961 : ATSV Linz
 1962 : WAT Atzgersdorf
 1963 : Rapid Wien
 1964 : Rapid Wien (2)
 1965 : Rapid Wien (3)
 1966 : Union West Wien
 1967 : Rapid Wien (4)
 1968 : UHC Salzburg
 1969 : UHC Salzburg (2)
 1970 : Union Edelweiß Linz
 1971 : Salzburger AK 1914
 1972 : UHC Salzburg (3)
 1973 : Union Krems
 1974 : Oberglas Bärnbach
 1975 : Union Krems (2)
 1976 : Oberglas Bärnbach (2)
 1977 : Union Krems (3)
 1978 : ASKÖ Linz SBL
 1979 : ASKÖ Linz SBL (2)
 1980 : ASKÖ Linz SBL (3)
 1981 : ASKÖ Linz SBL (4)
 1982 : Raika Köflach (3)
 1983 : ATSE Waagner Biro Graz
 1984 : ATSE Waagner Biro Graz (2)
 1985 : ATSE Waagner Biro Graz (3)
 1986 : Union Raika Stockerau
 1987 : ATSE Waagner Biro Graz (4)
 1988 : ATSE Waagner Biro Graz (5)
 1989 : UHK Volksbank Wien (2)
 1990 : ATSE Waagner Biro Graz (6)
 1991 : UHK Volksbank Wien (3)
 1992 : UHK Volksbank Wien (4)
 1993 : UHK Volksbank Wien (5)
 1994 : ASKÖ Linz SBL (5)
 1995 : ASKÖ Linz SBL (6)
 1996 : ASKÖ Linz SBL (7)
 1997 : HC Sparkasse Bruck
 1998 : HC Sparkasse Bruck (2)
 1999 : HSG Raiff. Bärnbach/Köflach (4)
 2000 : HSG Raiff. Bärnbach/Köflach (5)
 2001 : jet2web Bregenz
 2002 : jet2web Bregenz (2)
 2003 : Alpla HC Hard
 2004 : A1 Bregenz (3)
 2005 : A1 Bregenz (4)
 2006 : A1 Bregenz (5)
 2007 : A1 Bregenz (6)
 2008 : A1 Bregenz (7)
 2009 : A1 Bregenz (8)
 2010 : A1 Bregenz (9)
 2011 : HC Fivers Margareten
 2012 : Alpla HC Hard (2)
 2013 : Alpla HC Hard (3) 
 2014 : Alpla HC Hard (4) 
 2015 : Alpla HC Hard (5)
 2016 : HC Fivers Margareten (2)
 2017 : Alpla HC Hard (6)
 2018 : HC Fivers Margareten (3)
 2019 : UHK Krems (4)
 2020 : No Champion (COVID-19 pandemic) 
 2021 : Alpla HC Hard (7)
 2022 : UHK Krems (5)

EHF coefficient ranking
For season 2017–2018, see footnote

23.  (32)  Lotto Eredivisie (10.78)
24.  (20)  Süper Ligi (9.67)
25.  (26)  Handball Liga Austria (9.00)
26.  (23)  A1 Ethniki (8.00)
27.  (36)  Olís deildin (7.00)

External links
 Official website

References

Handball Liga Austria
Austria
Handball
Professional sports leagues in Austria